Richard Liddell (c. 1694 – 22 June 1746) was an Irish MP and Chief Secretary for Ireland.

He was born the eldest son of Dennis Lyddell of Wakehurst Place, Sussex, one of the Commissioners of the Royal Navy and briefly the MP for Harwich. Richard was educated at Christ Church, Oxford, studied law at the Inner Temple and succeeded his father in 1717. He was a profligate rake and was obliged to make over his inheritance to his younger brother Charles following court judgements against him for adultery.

In 1741 he was elected MP for Bossiney but unseated on petition after a few months. He was, however, reseated on further petition, sitting until his death in 1746.

In 1745 he was made a Privy Counsellor in Ireland and appointed Chief Secretary for Ireland, a position he held until his death. He was also MP for Jamestown in the Parliament of Ireland from 1745 until his death.

He died unmarried.

References

1746 deaths
Alumni of Christ Church, Oxford
Members of the Inner Temple
Members of the Parliament of Ireland (pre-1801) for County Leitrim constituencies
Irish MPs 1727–1760
Members of the Privy Council of Ireland
British MPs 1741–1747
1690s births
Chief Secretaries for Ireland